Lunasia is a genus of flowering plants belonging to the family Rutaceae.

Its native range is Malesia to Papuasia and Northern Queensland.

Species
Species:
 Lunasia amara Blanco

References

Zanthoxyloideae
Zanthoxyloideae genera